Orr Eravuu is a 2010 Tamil independent horror film directed by three debutants, Hari Shankar, Hareesh Narayan and Krishna Sekhar. The film is about  Paranormal occurrences. Spirits and ghosts are believed to have a close kinship with the night. Based on this concept Orr Eravuu was made. The entire film was shot from the protagonist's viewpoint, using shaky camerawork, reportedly the first Indian viewpoint film.

Plot
Nakulan Ponnusamy, a paranormal investigator and proprietor of Silver Chord Services, travels from Chennai to Munnar where he goes to solve a case of a house believed to be haunted, belonging to businessman Anand Chandrasekar.  Nakul spends one full night in the haunted house and conducts his sophisticated paranormal investigation. Meanwhile, Nakul finds that three other investigators belonging to Seventh Sense Parapsychology team also had come to the house for investigation. After some horrible sequences and mysterious circumstances, Nakul is found dead in the house. Daisy, a reporter in a Television Program Metro Crimes, analyzes Nakul's death.

Cast

Production

Orr Eravuu was produced by one of the directors Hari Shankar under the banner Shankar Bros; it was the studio's first film project. The film was initially titled as Eraaa, before it was renamed.

Music
The music was composed by K. Venkat Prabu Shankar and Sam C. S. The film features one song that was supposedly penned by the spirit of legendary poet Kannadasan, through a medium, C. M. Rathnasamy, who has vast experience in this field of spirit interaction for nearly 30 years. The song was composed and performed by Sathish Kumar. The song includes the narration of the classic Tamil play Harichandra in which the lead character lives as a grave digger, describing the practice of funeral according to the good or bad life of the dead.

The soundtrack consists of three songs.

"Ucchi Malayil" - composed and performed by Sam C.S.
"Kaadhala" - composed by Sam C.S. and performed by Mancy and Sam C.S.
"Naan Oru Netraya Nayagan" - composed by Sathish Kumar and performed by Benny Dayal.

Reception
Orr Eravuu released to mixed critical response. Rediff's Pavithra Srinivasan gave the film 3 out of 5, citing that it was "definitely worth a watch". Malathai Rangaraja from The Hindu wrote: "The premise is interesting, the narration is new, the genre is fresh and the effort to be different is evident. Yet if the subject fails to keep the viewer glued to his seat, it's probably because the technical team is a let-down!" Bhama Devi Ravi from The Times of India gave the film 1.5 out of 5 and said: "...all the feverish excitement is lost when the film stays confined to the documentary feel [...] There are too many loopholes in the story [...] You come out feeling cheated of goosebumps". A Behindwoods.com reviewer gave it 2.5 out of 5, describing the film as "successfully scary".

Awards
Orr Eravuu won the Best Tamil Independent Film Award at the 2010 Chennai International Film Festival.

See also 
 Ambuli - The next film written and directed by Hari Shankar and Harish Narayan

References

 Orr Iravu - Offers lot more than just the first ever "View Point" experience at Clapsandboos.com

External links
 
 

2010 films
2010 horror films
Indian horror films
2010s Tamil-language films
Films scored by Sam C. S.
Films shot in Munnar
2010 directorial debut films